Francis Donald Miller (April 9, 1920 – January 17, 1996) was a United States Army colonel, executive director of the USOC, a national collegiate champion boxer, and U.S. Olympic Boxing Team head coach.

Early life and education
Miller was born in Racine, Wis on April 9, 1920. He graduated from St. Catherine's High School in 1939 and then earned a physical education degree from the University of Wisconsin.

He won the 1943 national collegiate boxing title while at Wisconsin. He coached the United States boxing teams in the 1951 Pan American Games and 1956 Olympic Games.

Military career
Earning the rank of second lieutenant in ROTC program at the University of Wisconsin, Miller entered into active service and commissioned as an officer at Fort Benning, Georgia, in April, 1943. During European combat in World War II he served as a company commander for the 313th Infantry Regiment, 79th Division. On November 24, 1945, he was wounded by enemy fire while leading a 7th Army platoon into the city of Strasbourg, France. Miller received multiple awards for his military career, including a Purple Heart and Silver Star. For his sports career, Miller went to Fort Monmouth, New Jersey and was in charge of boxing held at the U.S. Special Services School. 

In 1949 he was assigned to the U.S. Army sports and recreation director at the Pentagon in Washington D.C. During the 1950s, Miller worked for the Eighth United States Army as an assistant and the Fourth United States Army as a supervisor. In 1961, he was assigned to the Adjutant General's office at Fort Amador, Panama. Miller was also head of the Army sports programs and a member of the USOC board of directors

Olympics career
After retiring from the Army, Miller devoted the remainder of his life to the United States Olympic Committee (USOC) and America's athletes. He served in a variety of positions for the USOC, starting in 1969, when he worked as an assistant executive director and led the fundraising department. In 1973, Miller was named executive director and remained at that position until 1985. During his position, Miller provided athletes with sports medicine and was a National Sports Festival planner. He was President of the U.S. Olympic Foundation from 1985 until his passing in 1996.

Miller received the Knight of Maltain 1965 and the Olympic Order in 1984. The following year, Miller was presented with a Board of Governors' award from the Touchdown Club of Washington. He was inducted into the U.S. Olympic Hall of Fame of the National Association of Sports and Physical Education. Miller also received the Centennial Trophy from the U.S. Olympic Committee in 1995.

Miller was married and had two 2 children.

Awards and recognition
1965 - Knighted into the Order of Malta

1984 - awarded the IOC Silver Olympic Order

1984 - inducted into the U.S. Olympic Hall of Fame

1985 - presented the DC Touchdown Club's Board of Governor's Award

1985 - awarded The Olympic & Paralympic Torch Award

1995 - awarded the IOC Centennial Trophy

1997 - F. Don Miller residence hall dedicated at Olympic Training Center

2001 - inducted into the St. Catherine's H.S. Hall of Fame

United States Army Decorations

References

External links 
https://www.teamusa.org/Hall-of-Fame/Hall-of-Fame-Members/F-Don-Miller
https://usopm.org/f-don-miller/

1920 births
1996 deaths
Military personnel from Wisconsin
Recipients of the Silver Star
United States Army colonels
United States Olympic Committee
Burials at Fort Sam Houston National Cemetery
Wisconsin Badgers boxers
United States Army personnel of World War II
American boxing trainers
United States Army personnel of the Korean War
People from Racine, Wisconsin